Ganbatyn Erdenebold (born May 28, 1993) is a Mongolian artistic gymnast. He represented Mongolia
at the 2010 Summer Youth Olympics where he won an individual gold medal
on the vault.

2010 Summer Youth Olympics 
At the 2010 Summer Youth Olympics, Erdeneboldt qualified 37th in the all-around, and did not qualify.
However, in the event finals, he was able to earn a gold medal on vault, a first for Mongolia. He also placed 5th on the still rings.

References 
http://www.gz2010.cn/info/ENG/ZB/ZBB101A_GA@@@@@@@@@@@@@@@ENG_number=259619.htm 

1993 births
Mongolian male artistic gymnasts
Living people
Gymnasts at the 2010 Summer Youth Olympics
Youth Olympic gold medalists for Mongolia
Gymnasts at the 2010 Asian Games
Gymnasts at the 2014 Asian Games
Asian Games competitors for Mongolia
21st-century Mongolian people